Zhang Shusheng was a Chinese official of the Qing Dynasty. He was one of the Huai Army's vice leaders, and his young brother Zhang Shushan was also a Lieutenant General, but died in a battle against the Taiping Rebellion in De'an County in 1867.

Qing dynasty generals
Politicians from Hefei
1824 births
1884 deaths
Generals from Anhui
Political office-holders in Guizhou
Political office-holders in Guangxi
Political office-holders in Guangdong
Qing dynasty politicians from Anhui
Viceroys of Zhili
Viceroys of Liangjiang
Viceroys of Liangguang
Huai Army personnel